The Bud Adams Equestrian Center is a multi-purpose arena and equestrian center in Fort Pierce, Florida on the St. Lucie County Fairgrounds.  It can seat up to 5,000, and in 2007 was the home to the Port St. Lucie Mustangs indoor football team.

The Equestrian Center, with 3,462 permanent seats, is used for a variety of events including rodeos, horse shows and concerts (seating up to 5,000).  The arena measures 75,000 square feet (7,000 m²) of total space.  All permanent seats are bleachers.

Other facilities
The complex hosts, in addition to the above events, trade shows, conventions and other special events.

External links
Fairgrounds Website

Indoor arenas in Florida
Fort Pierce, Florida
Sports venues in St. Lucie County, Florida
Convention centers in Florida
Music venues in Florida